John-Paul Lee aka 이창선 (born October 12, 1978) is the Founder and CEO of Tavalon Tea, a New York City-based tea company that sells premium teas and related tea products from all over the world.

John-Paul received his BBA from James Madison University in 2001 with degrees in Finance and Computer Information Systems(CIS).  John-Paul began his career as a consultant at Accenture (formerly Anderson Consulting) in 2001.  

Lee left Accenture in 2005 to start Tavalon Tea in hopes of fulfilling a void in the US premium tea market and pursue his entrepreneurial dreams.

In September 2012, John-Paul partnered up with Marja Vongerichten of the Kimchi Chronicles (and wife of 3 Michelin Star Chef - Jean-Georges Vongerichten) to create his latest Korean restaurant venture, BiBiFresh aka. Kosofresh.

Honors & awards

John-Paul has been profiled by many publications since he founded Tavalon Tea in 2005 including Entrepreneur Magazine, The New York Times, Business Week, theStreet.com, NPR, etc...  Most recently, America.gov featured John-Paul in their gallery of successful start up entrepreneurs alongside Bill Gates, Michael Dell, Russell Simmons, Larry Page, Sergey Brin, Kevin Plank, & Mark Zuckerberg.  

Lee was also recognized as a business leader by the Asian American Business Development Center (AABDC) and honored with the "Outstanding 50 Asian Americans in Business Award" in 2010.  In 2011, the US Pan Asian American Chamber of Commerce bestowed John-Paul with the Top 10 Asian American Business Award for his accomplishments as a young and emerging entrepreneur.

In September 2011, John-Paul was selected as a member of the Entrepreneurial Sounding Board Committee for Columbia Business School, where he engages with MBA students and helps pursue their entrepreneurial ideas and ventures.  Lee is also an official member and mentor within the Columbia Mentorship Program for Entrepreneurs at the Columbia University's Business School.

In October 2011, John-Paul Lee was honored with a committee board seat for the Asian American Business Development Center(AABDC).

Personal life
John-Paul Lee was born on October 12, 1978 in Fairfax, Virginia and raised in Great Falls, Virginia.  Originally given a Korean name, Chang Sun Lee (이창선), he was renamed John-Paul Lee upon being blessed by Pope John Paul II in Washington, D.C.  He moved to Seoul, Korea at the age of 10 where he spent 4 years of his childhood and returned to the United States of America in 2003.  

John-Paul currently resides in New York City but travels frequently to Asia where he is in the process of expanding Tavalon Tea.

Tavalon Tea

References

Sources
New York Times - On East 14th Street, It's Always Time for Tea New York Times
뉴욕의 프리미엄 티 브랜드 타바론(TAVALON) 창업자 존-폴 리 John-Paul Lee Asia Herald
John-Paul Lee and the New Ghost by Rolls-Royce Noblesse Magazine
Dress to Impress Entrepreneur Magazine
 Interview with Tavalon's Founder - 존폴리 매일경제
An Interview with Tavalon Tea's CEO John-Paul Lee T Ching
Tavalon Tea Founder John-Paul Lee Asian Fusion Magazine
America.gov highlights 9 successful entrepreneurs- Photo Gallery / America.gov featuring Tavalon Founders- Article America.gov
Modern Tea Trends with John-Paul Lee Momentum Women
TheStreet.com Interview with Tavalon CEO John-Paul Lee theStreet.com
Tea for Two New York Post
Business Week Interviews John-Paul Lee Business Week
Starting a Tea Company-Interview with John-Paul Lee Gaebler
공차 vs. 타바론 매일경제 매일경제
JMU Notable Alumni John-Paul Lee Mainstreet
American's Turning Their Attention to Tea - Interview with Tavalon Tea's John-Paul Lee National Public Radio (NPR)
Outstanding 50 Asian Americans in Business Award 2010 AABDC
How Young Businesses Compete in Tough Industries The Modesto Bee
생방송투데이 - 스윗솔트 대표이사 이창선 SBS
Interview with John-Paul Lee, CEO of BEPL TechM
John-Paul Lee Columbia University Business School Columbia University

American chief executives of food industry companies
Living people
Businesspeople from New York City
American people of Korean descent
James Madison University alumni
1978 births
People from Fairfax, Virginia
People from Great Falls, Virginia
Columbia University faculty